Olga Mikhailovna Sukhareva (born 15 March 1963 in Orenburg) is a Russian female chess player who holds the ICCF titles of International Master (IM, 2014) and Lady Grandmaster (LGM, 2006) and the FIDE titles of Woman FIDE Master (WFM) and FIDE Arbiter (FA, 2021). She was the seventh and eighth Ladies World Correspondence Chess Champion.

References

External links 
 
 

1963 births
Living people
Russian female chess players
World Correspondence Chess Champions